The 8th Grey Cup was played on December 4, 1920, before 10,088 fans at Varsity Stadium at Toronto.

The University of Toronto Varsity Blues defeated the Toronto Argonauts 16–3.

External links
 
 

08
Grey Cup
Grey Cup, 8th
1920 in Ontario
December 1920 sports events
1920s in Toronto
Toronto Varsity Blues football
Toronto Argonauts
December 1920 events in Canada